The Shire of Ararat was a local government area about  west-northwest of Melbourne, the state capital of Victoria, Australia. The shire did not cover the town of Ararat, which was managed by a separate local government authority.

History

Ararat was first incorporated as a road district on 27 August 1861, and became a shire on 8 March 1864. Parts of its North Riding were annexed to the Shire of Stawell on 26 October 1926, while other portions were annexed to the City of Ararat on 1 October 1941 and 27 May 1960.

On 23 September 1994, the Shire of Ararat was abolished, and along with the City of Ararat and parts of the Shire of Stawell, was merged into the newly created Rural City of Ararat.

Wards

The Shire of Ararat was divided into four ridings, each of which elected three councillors:
 North Riding
 South Riding
 East Riding
 West Riding

Towns and localities
 Buangor
 Dunneworthy
 Elmhurst
 Lake Bolac
 Mafeking
 Maroona
 Mininera
 Moyston
 Norval
 Pomonal
 Rossbridge
 Streatham
 Tatyoon
 Warrak
 Westmere
 Wickliffe
 Willaura
 Yalla-y-Poora

Population

* Estimate in the 1958 Victorian Year Book.

References

Ararat
1861 establishments in Australia